LP is the second album from lo-fi improvisational electronica band Holy Fuck. The album was nominated for Alternative Album of the Year at the 2008 Juno Awards and was nominated for the 2008 Polaris Music Prize. Owen Pallett contributed to the album, playing the violin part on 'Lovely Allen'. A remix version of "Royal Gregory" is featured on the soundtrack to Midnight Club: Los Angeles.

Several of the tracks on LP first appeared on Holy Fuck EP, self-released in 2007. Only one track from EP did not make it to LP, "They're Going to Take My Thumbs", which went on to be used in Breaking Bad.

Track listing
"Super Inuit" – 3:33 (recorded live in Dave King's barn)
"Milkshake" – 3:28
"Frenchy's" – 2:53
"Lovely Allen" – 4:29
"The Pulse" – 5:55*
"Royal Gregory" – 3:49
"Echo Sam" – 4:26
"Safari" – 4:23*
"Choppers" – 4:16*

*Recorded live by Craig James on The Verge, XM satellite radio

References

2007 albums
Holy Fuck albums
Young Turks (record label) albums